Kungerdeh (also Romanized as Kūngerdeh) is a village in Abolfares Rural District, in the Central District of Ramhormoz County, Khuzestan Province, Iran. At the 2006 census, its population was 331, in 60 families.

References 

Populated places in Ramhormoz County